Power to Change is a charitable trust operating in England, created in 2015 with a £150 million endowment from the Big Lottery Fund.

The trust is solely concerned with supporting community businesses in England over a ten-year period, after which it will cease operating.

The trust's ultimate goal for its funding to lead to ‘better places through community business’, reflecting their belief that community businesses contribute more than just economic impact but can also lead to greater community cohesion and appetite for community-led development.

Life Cycle 
Power to Change's work is defined by three phases over the ten-year period of its existence.
 The first phase to 2018 will focus on growing the community business world in specific sectors and places through capital and revenue grants, and business support advice.
 The second phase will concentrate on assisting community businesses to make a bigger impact in specific areas on wider issues, such as unemployment, and deploy the learning from the first phase on how best to create conditions for successful community businesses.
 The final phase will be focused on demonstrating the impact of community businesses and ensuring a legacy to enable the continued future growth of the sector.

Operations 
 The trust ran an initial grants programme (now closed) that awarded £8 million of grant funding to community businesses.
 £2m has been invested into two blended funding pilots, where non-repayable grant funding is used to unlock appropriate repayable finance. These pilots are hoped to release around £6m of investment that community businesses wouldn't be able to access otherwise. 
 In March 2016 the trust launched a £1 million match funding pilot with the Community Shares Unit which will be used to boost the investment that community businesses raise through community share offers.
 Applications for its £10 million Community Business Fund will be accepted from April 2016, awarding grants between £50,000- £300,000.
 In partnership with the Department for Communities and Local Government, Power to Change set up a £3.62 million community pub business support programme in March 2016. This will be delivered by the Plunkett Foundation.
 Inception funds for earlier stage community businesses opened in 2016.
 The Power to Change Research Institute was set up with a £7.5 million budget as part of the trust's commitment to building a strong evidence base for the positive impact of community business. It released its first report on the size of the community business market in March 2016.

Governance 
The organisation is governed by a board of 11 trustees, chaired by Stephen Howard, CEO of Business in the Community. Its Chief Executive is Vidhya Alakeson, formerly Deputy Chief Executive of the Resolution Foundation. The trust has offices in London, Bristol and Sheffield.

References

Funding bodies in the United Kingdom